Ronald Herron (born c. 1982), known as Ra Diggs, is an American former rapper and convicted murderer, gang leader, and drug trafficker, formerly based in Brooklyn, New York City.

Career 
He began a career on November 25, 2008, creating a YouTube blog channel called "RaDiggsTV". It has 435 subscribers and 64,396 views as of March 10, 2022.

On March 10, 2010, he created a YouTube channel called "VANGODENT". It has over 3,120 subscribers as of March 2022. He would post music videos to the channel.

On June 11, 2010, he released a song to the channel called "Eulogy". It has over 1,007,000 views as of March 2022.

Imprisonment 
Ra Diggs was arrested on October 5, 2010, on drug charges, and was alleged to be leader of the Bloods-affiliated "Murderous Mad Dogs". He was convicted on June 26, 2014, of 21 federal charges, including racketeering, drug dealing, and three murders. At trial, several of Ra Diggs songs and music videos were used as evidence because they were "literal recountings of his crimes". The federal prosecuting attorney said:He styled himself a rap artist, but the jury's verdict makes clear who Herron really is: a drug dealer and murderer who sought power through fear and intimidation.

On April 2, 2015, he was sentenced to three life terms plus 105 years in prison. He told the judge that he could give him 10 life terms and that he was only going to die once, after which he was sentenced to 12 life terms plus 105 years in prison. He is being held at USP Florence High in Colorado.

On April 8, 2015, Herron sent an appeal to the United States Court of Appeals for the Second Circuit claiming that his conviction violated his constitutional First Amendment rights. The conviction was upheld on February 14, 2019, with the court saying that his First Amendment challenge was "without merit".

References

Other sources

Living people
Rappers from Brooklyn
Prisoners sentenced to life imprisonment by the United States federal government
21st-century American rappers
Year of birth missing (living people)
Inmates of ADX Florence